Racheal Ekoshoria is a weightlifting athlete from Nigeria. She competes in the women's +75 kg class.

Career
Racheal competed at the 2010 Summer Youth Olympic Games in Singapore in under 58 kg event and won a bronze medal. At the 2016 African Weightlifting Championships in Yaoundé, Cameroon , she won silver in less than 58 kg with a result of 192 kg.

See also 
Weightlifting at the 2010 Summer Youth Olympics
 Nigeria at the 2010 Summer Youth Olympics

References

External links 
 Athlete/Event List 
Ekoshoria wins bronze

Nigerian female weightlifters
1994 births
Living people
20th-century Nigerian women
21st-century Nigerian women